The ZH-29 was a semi-automatic rifle developed in Czechoslovakia during the late 1920s, and used by the Chinese National Revolutionary Army.

Overview
The ZH-29 is a gas-operated service rifle with a tilting-bolt locking system similar to that which would be later used in the Sturmgewehr 44; although while the bolt of the German gun tilts vertically, that of the ZH-29 does so to the left side.  Externally the most distinctive feature is that the barrel is offset at a slight angle to the receiver to compensate for this. Also unusually, the  rifle uses an aluminium barrel jacket.

An upgraded variant was designated ZH-32.

In China, Chang Tso-lin's army received 150 ZH-29 and 100 ZH-32. Provincial troops of Guangdong also received 33 ZH-32. A derivative prototype was built in 1932 in Shenyang. It is unlikely these guns saw action during the Sino-Japanese War.

A version chambered in .276 Pedersen was submitted to US Army trials but was unsuccessful.

In the last stages of the development of an AK-47, the testing grounds committe advised Mikhail Kalashnikov to redesign the trigger group of the AK-46 prototype along the lines of ZH-29, which he did. The testing grounds committe advised every competitor on how to generally improve their designs.

Users
 : 210 imported in 1930-31
 : 100 ZH-32s
 : (Experimental prototype copy)

See also
Weapons of Czechoslovakia interwar period
Kbsp wz. 1938M

References

External links

Patents
charging device patent
gas piston rod patent
gas pressure regulator patent
firing mechanism patent

7.92×57mm Mauser semi-automatic rifles
Semi-automatic rifles of Czechoslovakia
World War II infantry weapons
World War II infantry weapons of China
World War II infantry weapons of Germany
World War II semi-automatic rifles
Military equipment introduced in the 1930s